IK Tauri or NML Tauri is a Mira variable star located about  from the Sun in the zodiac constellation of Taurus.

Discovery
In 1965, Neugebauer, Martz, and Leighton, astronomers with the California Institute of Technology, reported the discovery of two extremely cool stars. At the time, the temperatures of these extremely red objects were estimated to be around 1,000 K.

In the absence of other designations, these were named after the initials of their discoverers as NML Cygni and NML Tauri. It was identified as a Mira variable in 1967. The name NML Tauri fell into disuse after the star received its variable star designation of IK Tauri.

Variability
IK Tauri varies approximately every 470 days between extreme visual magnitudes of 10.8 and 16.5. It was classified as a Mira variable soon after discovery on the basis of its spectrum showing strong hydrogen emission and its very large visual amplitude. During each cycle, the spectrum of the star also varies, consistently reaching M10 near minimum and only M6-M8 at maximum.

Properties
IK Tauri pulsates strongly every 470 days, being coolest and largest at minimum brightness. The bolometric luminosity varies less dramatically and is estimated to be . The temperature is calculated to be only 2,234 K, and the radius is calculated to be .

IK Tauri has strong maser emission from its extended atmosphere and circumstellar material. The circumstellar material is rich in dust, with alumina close to the star and silicates further out. The two types of dust form separate shells, one within twice the star's radius and one more than three times its radius. The densest region of dust is at 6-8 times IK Tauri's radius.

Although IK Tauri is far below naked eye visibility, even at maximum brightness, this is due to the low temperature and strong extinction at visual wavelengths. In the infrared, it is brighter than prominent stars such as Rigel (K-band magnitude +0.18) and comparable to Sirius (K-band magnitude −1.35).

Evolution
It has exhausted its core hydrogen and helium, is not massive enough to ignite its carbon-oxygen core, and is now alternately fusing in concentric hydrogen and helium shells. As the inert core grows and the hydrogen shell nears the surface, mass loss becomes very high, and the star becomes highly obscured visually, an infrared star. It will then quickly lose its entire atmosphere, creating a planetary nebula and leaving behind a white dwarf.

References 

Mira variables
M-type giants
Taurus (constellation)
J03532886+1124216
IRAS catalogue objects
Emission-line stars
Tauri, IK